Travis William Collins (born 4 May 1985, Campbelltown) is an Australian country music singer-songwriter and guitarist. Three of his albums have reached the ARIA Albums Chart top 20, Hard Light (2016), Brave & the Broken (2018) and Wreck Me (2020). He has won eight Golden Guitar trophies at the annual Country Music Awards of Australia and four CMC Australian awards. Collins is an ambassador for RUOK? Day.

Early life

Travis William Collins was born on 4 May 1985 in Cessnock, New South Wales, Australia. He is the second youngest son of six children, their parents are Terry Collins, also a musician, and Debbie ( Conroy). Collins busked on Peel Street, Tamworth at age 11. He was a graduate of the NSW Public Schools Talent Development Program.

Career

In January 2004 Travis Collins competed at the Star Maker Quest at the Tamworth Country Music Festival. He won for his performance of "Bridge That You Won't Burn", which was co-written by Collins with his father Terry. "Bridge That You Won't Burn" was released as his debut single in May 2004. He issued his debut studio album, Start the Car, in 2005 via ABC Music. It peaked at No. 15 on the ARIA Hitseekers Albums chart.

His second album, No Boundaries (18 August 2007), reached No. 18 on the ARIA Hitseekers Albums chart. It was co-produced by Collins and Herm Kovac. Dave Dawson of Nu Country observed, " the peaks are the album's finale – anthemic agoraphobia escape tune 'Walls Come Down' and summary justice narrative 'What Comes Around'." Capital News Susan Jarvis felt, "[it's a] collection of great tracks points to a stellar international career... [and] is sheer class, featuring several [Collins] originals and some well-chosen tracks from leading writers."

His third album is self-titled and appeared on 7 November 2011 but it did not chart. On 13 February 2015 Collins released his fourth studio album, Wired, via Universal Music Australia, which peaked at No. 26 on the ARIA Albums Chart; it also debuted at No. 1 on the associated ARIA Country Albums Chart. Kevin Walsh of Good Morning Country proclaimed it Album of the Week, and explained, "[it] couples classic country sounds with the artist’s unique ear for a captivating rock tune."

Collins joined fellow country artist Adam Brand, together with Drew McAlister (ex-McAlister Kemp), Matt Cornell (ex-Baby Animals) and Mike Carr ( Buddy Goode) to perform as Adam Brand and the Outlaws at the Gympie Muster in August 2015. They issued an album, Adam Brand and the Outlaws, in January 2016.

Hard Light, the artist's fifth album, appeared on 6 May 2016, which peaked at No. 20 on the ARIA Albums Chart and No. 2 on the related Country Albums Chart. Sunburnt Country Music{{}}s Sophie Hamley felt, "[it provides] solid country rock performed with an ability to sing a sweet note and make it sound authentic." Staff writer for Yarrawonga Chronicle described how, "[it] moves everything up a gear, with Collins digging deeper than ever before, not only with his vocals but also as a musician and a songwriter." At 2017 Country Music Awards of Australia (CMAA) Collins won three Golden Guitar trophies: Male Artist of the Year for Hard Light, Song of the Year for "Call Me Crazy" (shared with co-writer, Damien Leith), and Single of the Year for "Just Another Girl".

Collins collaborated with label mate, Amber Lawrence, on the seven-track extended play, Our Backyard (31 July 2017), which peaked at No. 40 on the ARIA Albums Chart and No. 2 on the Country Albums Chart. It details Australian stories about life, love and friendship. At the 2018 Country Music Awards of Australia he won three more Golden Guitar trophies: Vocal Collaboration of the Year (with Lawrence) for "Our Backyard", Song of the Year for "Our Backyard" (shared with Lawrence and Matt Scullion) and Single of the Year for "Our Backyard" (shared with Lawrence).

On 17 August 2018 Collins released his sixth solo album, Brave and the Broken, recorded in Nashville with all tracks written or co-written by Collins. He was joined in the studio by session musicians, Carl Miner on acoustic guitar (Taylor Swift), Mike Rojas on keyboards (Luke Bryan), and Jimmy Carter on bass guitar (Alan Jackson); it was produced by Luke Wooten (Brad Paisley, Dierks Bentley). Brave and the Broken peaked at No. 15 on ARIA Albums Chart, No. 1 on its Country Albums Chart, No. 4 on ARIA Australian Artists Albums, No. 5 on Top 100 Physical Albums and No. 10 on Digital Albums charts. Rebecca Belt of The Country Journo observed, "

The artist's seventh studio album. Wreck Me, appeared 31 July 2020, which peaked at No. 8 on ARIA Albums Chart and No. 1 on their Country Albums Chart. It was produced by Wooten, again. Hamley determined, "you're always going to be listening to an album that is produced to high standards, that has tight songs, in which Collins will use his fantastic voice – so well suited to country music – to make sure those songs find their best expression." The album provided three singles, "Make Up", "Weekend" and "Rainy Day". Later that year he issued an acoustic version of Wreck Me.

In May 2021 Collins was featured vocalist on Canadian country artist Jess Moskaluke's single "Leave Each Other Alone" from her second album, The Demos (February 2021).

Discography

Studio albums

 Re-recorded albums 

 Extended plays 

Awards and nominations

AIR Awards

The Australian Independent Record Awards (known colloquially as the AIR Awards) is an annual awards night to recognise, promote and celebrate the success of Australia's Independent Music sector.

! 
|-
| 2021
| Wreck Me| Best Independent Country Album or EP
| 
| 
|}

APRA Awards

The APRA Awards are held in Australia and New Zealand by the Australasian Performing Right Association to recognise songwriting skills, sales and airplay performance by its members annually. Collins has been nominated for two awards.

! 
|-
| 2017
| "Call Me Crazy"
| Country Work of the Year
| 
| 
|-
| 2020
| "Happy"
| Most Performed Country Work of the Year
| 
| 

ARIA Music Awards

The ARIA Music Awards is an annual awards ceremony that recognises excellence, innovation, and achievement across all genres of Australian music.

! 
|-
| 2018
| Brave & The Broken 
| Best Country Album 
| 
| 
|-
| 2020
| Wreck Me| Best Country Album
| 
| 

CMC Awards

The CMC Awards are awarded annually by Country Music Channel Australia.

!
|-
|rowspan="3"| 2017 || Travis Collins || Male Artist of the Year  ||  ||rowspan="3"| 
|-
| Travis Collins || Australian Artist of the Year || 
|-
| Travis Collins "Call Me Crazy" || Video of the Year || 
|-
|rowspan="4"| 2018 || Travis Collins || Male Artist of the Year ||  ||rowspan="4"| 
|-
| Travis Collins || Australian Artist of the Year || 
|-
| Travis Collins "Hometown Calling" || Australian Video of the Year || 
|-
| Travis Collins and Amber Lawrence || Group or Duo of the Year || 

Country Music Awards of Australia (CMAA)

Collins has won eight awards at the Country Music Awards of Australia held annually in Tamworth since 1973.

!
|-
|rowspan="3"| 2017 || Hard Light || Male Vocalist of the Year ||  || rowspan="8"|
|-
| "Call Me Crazy"  || APRA AMCOS Song of the Year || 
|-
| "Just Another Girl" || Single of the Year || 
|-
|rowspan="3"| 2018 || "Our Backyard" (with Amber Lawrence) || Vocal Collaboration of the Year || 
|-
| "Our Backyard" (Amber Lawrence, Collins, Matt Scullion) || APRA AMCOS Song of the Year || 
|-
| "Our Backyard" (with Amber Lawrence) || Single of the Year || 
|-
| 2019 || Brave & the Broken || Male Vocalist of the Year || 
|-
| 2021 || Wreck Me'' || Male Artist of the Year || 
|-

References

External links

Australian country singers
Living people
1985 births